"I Believe in U" is a song written and performed by Ukrainian singer Jamala. The song was presented on 12 May 2017 in Kyiv in Palace of Sports at the concert of the singer. It was released as a digital download on 14 May 2017 by Enjoy! Records.

Live performances
On 13 May 2017, Jamala performed the song during the voting interval of the final of the Eurovision Song Contest 2017, which took place at the International Exhibition Centre in Kyiv, Ukraine. The performance was disrupted by a man draped in an Australian flag who invaded the stage and briefly mooned the audience before being removed by security. The stage invader was later identified to be Ukrainian prankster Vitalii Sediuk.

Music video
The shooting of the clip of the singer Jamala's song "I Believe in U" was held in April in Portugal. Directed by Igor Stekolenko, who directed over a hundred music videos for Ukrainian and foreign artists, including Okean Elzy and Brutto. The video shoot lasted three days and took place in Portuguese capital, Lisbon. The premiere of the video took place in 17 May. Lisbon hosted the next year's contest.

Track listing

Release history

References

2017 songs
2017 singles
English-language Ukrainian songs
Jamala songs